Triprion petasatus is a species of frog in the family Hylidae found in Belize, Guatemala, Honduras, and Mexico. Its natural habitats are subtropical or tropical dry forests, moist savanna, freshwater marshes, intermittent freshwater marshes, rural gardens, heavily degraded former forests, aquaculture ponds, and canals and ditches.

References

External links 

Triprion
Amphibians described in 1865
Taxonomy articles created by Polbot